The 2015–16 season is the 114th season of competitive football in Hong Kong, starting in July 2015 and ending in June 2016.

Promotion and relegation

Pre-season

Representative team

Hong Kong national football team

2018 FIFA World Cup qualification

The draw for the group stage of second round qualification was held in Kuala Lumpur, Malaysia on 14 April 2015. Hong Kong was drawn with China PR, Qatar and Maldives and Bhutan in group C. Hong Kong has started their qualifying campaign in June 2015.

2015 Hong Kong–Macau Interport

2016 Guangdong–Hong Kong Cup

2016 AYA Bank Cup

International friendlies

Hong Kong women's national football team

2016 Women Guangdong–Hong Kong Cup

League season

Premier League

First Division League

Second Division League

Third Division League

Reserve Division League

Cup Competitions

Community Cup

Senior Shield

League Cup

FA Cup

Sapling Cup

Season play-off

 
2015 in Hong Kong sport
2015 in association football
2016 in Hong Kong sport
2016 in association football
Seasons in Hong Kong football